Bulería is the second studio album recorded by Spanish singer David Bisbal, following Corazón Latino (2002). It was released by Vale Music, Universal Music Spain and Universal Music Latino on February 10, 2004 (see 2004 in music). It is primarily dance music, containing both slow and fast pieces. Two of the songs on the album were co-written by Bisbal. The song "Esta Ausencia" was chosen as theme song for the Mexican telenovela Piel de Otoño (2005), produced by Mapat L. de Zatarain, starring Laura Flores and René Strickler, while Sergio Goyri, Sabine Moussier and Manuel Landeta, starred as antagonists. Gerardo Munguía and María Marcela starred as stellar performances. Raquel Olmedo starred as special participation.

Track listing 
 "Bulería" (Kike Santander, Gustavo Santander) – 4:13
 "Permítame Señora" (Angel Martinez) – 4:45
 "Oye El Boom" (K. Santander) – 4:28
 "Esta Ausencia" (K. Santander) – 4:37
 "¿Cómo Olvidar?" (Antonio Rayo Sr., José Miguel Velasquez) – 4:34
 "Me Derrumbo" (Aaron Benward, Jess Cates) – 4:11
 "Camina y Ven" (K. Santander) – 4:22
 "Se Acaba" (Ricardo Montaner, K. Santander) – 3:55
 "Ángel de la Noche" (K. Santander) – 3:26
 "Desnúdate Mujer" (David Bisbal, Velasquez) – 4:41
 "Condenado a Tu Amor" (K. Santander) – 4:29
 "Amores del Sur" (Sergio Domínguez, Markus Johannes Katier, Gabriel Loré) – 3:50

Singles

"Desnúdate Mujer"
The song is a passionate and sexual ballad, pleading a woman to literally "get naked" and be unfaithful to her partner with the singer. The song peaked at #6 on the Billboard Hot Latin Songs chart.

Personnel 

 Pedro Alfonso – Violin, Viola
 Luis Aquino – Trumpet
 Daniel Betancourt – Arranger, Keyboards, Programming, Producer, Wind Arrangements, Choir Arrangement
 David Bisbal – Adaptation, Concept, Improvisation
 Richard Bravo – Percussion
 Ed Calle – Sax (Baritone), Sax (Tenor)
 Jason Carder – Trumpet
 Andres Castro – Guitar (Electric)
 Gustavo Celis – Arranger
 Tony Cousins – Mastering
 Sal Cuevas – Bajo Sexto
 Vicky Echeverria – Coros
 Robin Espejo – Coros
 Paco Fonta – Coro, Palmas
 Francesc Freixes – Graphic Design
 Jose Gaviria – Arranger, Keyboards, Programming, Producer, Coros
 Julio Hernandez – Bajo Sexto
 Lee Levin – Bateria
 Konstantin Litvinenko – Cello
 Miami Symphonic Strings – Cuerda
 José Antonio Molina – Choir Arrangement
 Virginia Moreno – Coro, Palmas
 Tedoy Mullet – Trumpet
 Andrés Múnera – Arranger, Keyboards, Programming, Producer
 Alfredo Oliva – Concert Comedienne
 Bernardo Ossa – Arranger, Keyboards, Programming, Producer, Fender Rhodes
 Rayito – Flamenco Guitar, Palmas
 Catalina Rodríguez – Coros
 Rubendarío – Photography, Estilista
 Milton Salcedo – Piano, Arranger, Keyboards, Programming, Producer, Wind Arrangements, Choir Arrangement
 Juan Sanchez – Flamenco Guitar
 Kike Santander – Arranger, Producer, Fender Rhodes, Wind Arrangements, Dirigida, Choir Arrangement, Improvisation
 Dana Teboe – Trombone
 Ramiro Teran – Arreglos, Coros
 Fernando Tobon – Guitar (Acoustic), Guitar (Electric)
 Camilo Valencia – Wind Arrangements
 Eugenio Vanderhorst – Copista
 Rafael Vergara – Coro, Coros
 Dan Warner – Guitar (Acoustic), Guitar (Electric)

Charts and certifications

Charts

Certifications

See also
List of best-selling albums in Spain

References 

2004 albums
David Bisbal albums
Universal Music Spain albums
Universal Music Latino albums
Spanish-language albums
Albums produced by Kike Santander